The Spartacist uprising, also known as the January uprising, was an armed uprising that took place in Berlin from 5 to 12 January 1919. It occurred in connection with the November Revolution that broke out following Germany's defeat in World War I. The uprising was primarily a power struggle between the Social Democratic Party of Germany (SPD) led by Friedrich Ebert, which favored a social democracy, and the Communist Party of Germany (KPD), led by Karl Liebknecht and Rosa Luxemburg, which wanted to set up a council republic similar to the one established by the Bolsheviks in Russia. In 1914 Liebknecht and Luxemburg had founded the Marxist Spartacus League, which gave the uprising its popular name.

The revolt was improvised and small scale and quickly crushed by the superior strength of government and paramilitary troops in what became known as Bloody Week. The death toll was roughly 150–200, mostly among the insurgents. The most prominent deaths were those of Karl Liebknecht and Rosa Luxemburg, who were murdered extrajudicially, almost certainly with the approval of the leaders of the provisional SPD-led government. The party's involvement hampered its position throughout the life of the Weimar Republic, although quashing of the uprising did allow elections for the National Assembly to take place as scheduled on 19 January. The Assembly went on to write the Weimar Constitution that created the first functioning German democracy.

Background and causes

On 9 November 1918, the Council of the People's Deputies under the leadership of Friedrich Ebert of the Majority Social Democratic Party of Germany (MSPD) was formed as a provisional Reich government following the collapse of the German Empire at the end of World War I. It had three representatives each from the MSPD and the more left-leaning Independent Social Democratic Party of Germany (USPD). The Supreme Army Command recognized the Council on 10 November in the secret Ebert-Groener Pact in which Wilhelm Groener, Quartermaster General of the German Army, assured Reich Chancellor Ebert of the loyalty of the armed forces. The MSPD leadership sought a rapid return to "orderly conditions" by means of elections to the National Assembly. The USPD, the Communist Party of Germany (KPD), parts of the working class and the Revolutionary Stewards – shop stewards independent of the official unions and freely chosen by workers – wanted to continue with and to safeguard their revolutionary goals of nationalizing property, stripping power from the military and establishing a dictatorship of the proletariat.

At the end of December 1918, Rosa Luxemburg and Karl Liebknecht founded the Communist Party of Germany. Because of the unhappiness of many workers with the course of the November Revolution, other left-socialist groups joined in the party's foundation. The Revolutionary Stewards, however, after deliberations with the Spartacists, decided to remain in the USPD. Rosa Luxemburg presented her founding program on 31 December 1918. In it she noted that the Communists could never take power without the clear support of the majority of the people. On 1 January she again urged that the KPD participate in the planned elections for the National Assembly, but she was outvoted. The majority hoped to gain power by continued agitation in the factories and by "pressure from the streets".

On 23 December the People's Marine Division, which had been assigned to protect the provisional government, took Otto Wels of the MSPD hostage to lend weight to its demand for payment of back wages. The following day, against the orders of the three MSPD Council representatives (Ebert, Philipp Scheidemann and Otto Landsberg), Berlin's police chief Emil Eichhorn of the USPD refused to use the security forces under his command against the People's Marine Division to free Wels from the Berlin Palace where he was being held. Ebert then had the army called in and ordered it to open fire in what came to be known as the skirmish of the Berlin Palace. Wels was freed, but eleven men from the People's Marine Division and 23 from the army were killed.

On 29 December the three USPD representatives Hugo Haase, Wilhelm Dittmann, and Emil Barth left the Council of People's Deputies in protest. The MSPD representatives then appointed MSPD members Gustav Noske and Rudolf Wissell to replace the USPD representatives on the Council. After that the USPD no longer saw the Council as a legitimate interim government. MSPD majorities in the two main workers' councils agreed to Ebert's wish to dismiss Police Chief Eichhorn, whom he now considered unreliable, but the USPD and KPD interpreted Eichhorn's dismissal as an attack on the revolution. This became the immediate trigger of the uprising.

Strikes and violence

On 4 January, the day Eichhorn was dismissed, the executive committee of the Berlin USPD and the Revolutionary Stewards decided to hold a demonstration on the following day. The 5 January demonstration took on a scale that exceeded all their expectations. During its course, armed demonstrators, incited and assisted by informers and provocateurs, occupied the printing plants of the Social Democratic newspaper Vorwärts and the Berliner Tageblatt, as well as several publishing houses' buildings, a printing plant and a telegraph office. The presumed redirection of the mass protests away from the government district to the newspaper district by police informers was described by historian Jörn Schütrumpf as a "strategic masterstroke".

The leading members of the Revolutionary Stewards, the USPD and the KPD met on the evening of 5 January to decide how to proceed. Most of those present supported the occupation of the Berlin newspaper district and were in favor of taking up the fight against the Social Democratic government. Karl Liebknecht had been "whipped into a state of revolutionary euphoria" by the size of the demonstration and the false report that all regiments in and around Berlin were on their side, whereas Rosa Luxemburg continued to oppose revolutionary actions. Only two spokesmen for the Revolutionary Stewards, Richard Müller and Ernst Däumig, spoke out against the course of action. While both in principle supported a second revolution against the Council of People's Deputies, they considered the timing premature and tactically unwise; they voted only for a general strike. A provisional revolutionary committee to overthrow the government and take power was decided on by about 70 of those present against 6 no votes from the ranks of the Revolutionary Stewards. The committee was formed from 53 people with Georg Ledebour, Liebknecht and Paul Scholze the three co-equal chairmen.

The following day, the Revolutionary Committee called on the workers of Berlin to stage a general strike on 7 January and overthrow Ebert's government. The call was answered by some 500,000 people who poured into the city center. They did not take part in any fighting in the days that followed, nor were they joined by the strike leaders, although they were ready to disarm the soldiers, as they had been on 9 November. Some of their placards and banners bore the same slogans as at the beginning of the November Revolution: "Peace and Unity".

Over the next two days, the committee could not agree on how to proceed. Some representatives called for armed insurrection, others pleaded for negotiations with Ebert. The committee was in particular unable to signal to the hundreds of thousands of demonstrators who were waiting for direction in the streets and squares what they should do. Because of that they went home again on the evenings of both 6 and 7 January. On those two days, in the estimation of journalist Sebastian Haffner, they would have had the chance to overthrow the government of the People's Deputies by taking over the Reich Chancellery. 

KPD leader Karl Liebknecht, initially against the advice of Rosa Luxemburg, supported the plan to unleash a civil war. The Council of People's Deputies was to be overthrown by force of arms and the elections to the National Assembly scheduled for 19 January prevented. Liebknecht feared that the KPD might otherwise isolate itself too much from the workers who sought the overthrow of the government. At the same time, KPD members tried to win over to their side some of the regiments stationed in Berlin, especially the People's Marine Division. They did not succeed because most of the soldiers were already at home, either because they had declared themselves neutral or because their loyalty was to the previous Council of People's Deputies. In addition, a part of Berlin's citizens, especially the middle class, rallied behind Ebert's government, heeding its call to strike and to act as living shields to secure government buildings.

On 6 January the Revolutionary Committee began negotiating with Ebert through the mediation of USPD leadership. The negotiations failed on 7 January due to the unwillingness of either side to compromise. The Council of People's Deputies demanded the evacuation of the occupied newspaper buildings, while the insurgents insisted on Eichhorn's reinstatement. The chance for a nonviolent settlement of the conflict was thus lost. On the same day, Ebert gave Gustav Noske command of the troops in and around Berlin, and calls went out for the formation of more Freikorps units. Since early December 1918, such Freikorps units had been forming from former frontline soldiers and volunteers. Now Ebert and Noske allowed them to muster around Berlin with organizations loyal to the Republic and with imperial regiments, some loyal but most hostile to the Republic. Immediately after Noske's appointment, he ordered that all members of the Revolutionary Committee be monitored so that they could be arrested later. To this end, 50 officers were posted in all Berlin post offices.

On 8 January the Council of People's Deputies called on the population to resist the insurgents and their intended takeover of the government and published a leaflet entitled "The Hour of Reckoning Approaches!" In it the insurgents were threatened with physical annihilation. On 9 January the central executive committee of the Berlin USPD and the KPD issued a joint appeal demanding a fight against "the Judases in the government. ... They belong in the penitentiary, on the scaffold. ... Use weapons against your mortal enemies."

The mass of the working class followed the call for a general strike to prevent the counterrevolution, but it did not want to have anything to do with military struggles. On the contrary, they continued to demand the unity of the socialist forces and, at a large meeting in the Humboldthain Park on 9 January, demanded the resignation of all the leaders responsible for the "fratricide". Both the Ebert government and Ledebour and Liebknecht were seen as responsible for the situation. Numerous resolutions from the factories called for an end to the street fighting and the creation of a government in which all socialist parties would be represented.

On 10 January the Freikorps Reinhard Brigade, led by Colonel Wilhelm Reinhard, attacked the Spartacist headquarters in Spandau. On 11 January Noske gave the order for action against those occupying the  newspaper building. The attackers, armed with military weapons, far outgunned their opponents. The Potsdam Freikorps captured the building with flame throwers, machine guns, mortars and artillery. Other occupied buildings and streets in the newspaper district were also taken over by 12 January. There were no organized battles because the insurgents were not prepared for them; in many cases they surrendered voluntarily. The military nevertheless shot over a hundred insurgents and an unknown number of uninvolved civilians in the area. On 11 January, for example, seven men who wanted to negotiate with the government troops for a surrender of the  building were taken to the Berlin Dragoon Barracks and shot. An investigative committee of the parliament of Prussia later put the overall death toll at 156. Among the military there were thirteen killed and twenty wounded.

On 13 January Freikorps units from the area around Berlin moved into the city, as did the Guards Cavalry Division, a unit of the soon to be dissolved Prussian Army under Captain Waldemar Pabst. Berlin newspapers hailed the troops' entry at the end of the fighting as the restoration of "peace and order". The military occupation was followed by many instances of violence committed by right-wing troops, far exceeding previous acts of violence by some from the Left.

Murders of Rosa Luxemburg and Karl Liebknecht

Right-wing groups had been agitating against German Communists and their leaders even before the January uprising. The Anti-Bolshevist League printed posters and appeals to the population of Berlin calling for the Bolshevik ringleaders to be found and handed over to the military. A high reward was offered. One leaflet that circulated in large numbers proclaimed: The Fatherland is close to ruin. Save it! It is not threatened from outside, but from within: from the Spartacus League. Strike their leaders dead! Kill Liebknecht! Then you will have peace, work and bread. –The frontline soldiers.After the uprising was crushed, the Spartacist leaders feared for their lives and went into hiding. The government sought them out as alleged putschists in order to prosecute them for the attempted coup before the 19 January elections. Fritz Henck, Philipp Scheidemann's son-in-law, publicly assured the residents of Berlin on 14 January that the leaders of the uprising "would not get off scot-free". In just a few days, he said, it would become clear "that things will get serious for them, too".

On the evening of 15 January, Rosa Luxemburg and Karl Liebknecht were found in the apartment of a friend, Dr. Markussohn, in Berlin-Wilmersdorf by the Wilmersdorf Citizens' Militia, arrested and taken to the Eden Hotel. Their whereabouts had probably become known through the telephone surveillance that Noske had ordered. Waldemar Pabst had the prisoners interrogated and mistreated over a period of hours. KPD leader Wilhelm Pieck, who was also arrested when he visited the apartment that evening, witnessed the abuse as well as a number of telephone calls, one of which Pabst probably made to the Reich Chancellery.

The murders of Luxemburg and Liebknecht were intended to look like an assassination. Private Otto Runge hit Rosa Luxemburg with his rifle butt as she was being led out of the hotel. She was pushed unconscious into a waiting car then shot in the temple by Freikorps Lieutenant Hermann Souchon. Her body was thrown into the Berlin Landwehr Canal by First Lieutenant Kurt Vogel and was not found until 31 May. 

Liebknecht was taken from the hotel shortly after Rosa Luxemburg and after getting into a waiting car was knocked almost unconscious, again by Otto Runge. The car stopped in the Berlin Tiergarten, Liebknecht was forced out then shot in the back as a "fugitive". His body was handed over to a Berlin police station as the "corpse of an unknown man".

KPD leader Wilhelm Pieck was able to obtain an order to have himself transferred to a prison and escaped en route.

Resulting unrest 
The killings of 15 January triggered serious unrest and uprisings throughout the German Reich. Gustav Noske deployed Freikorps and Reichswehr units against them and against the soviet republics set up in several major German cities. All were violently put down, the last being the Bavarian Soviet Republic which fell on 3 May. The fighting was often similar to that in Berlin and resulted in a total of about 5,000 deaths, including several political murders of leading representatives of the left.

Obstruction of justice 

On 16 January the Berlin press reported that Liebknecht had been shot while fleeing authorities and Luxemburg lynched by an angry crowd. The basis for this account was a document that Captain Pabst had written on the evening of the murders and had published as an official report from his division. After knowledge of the murders became public, the government called a special meeting at which Ebert is said to have expressed his shock at the murders of the former SPD party comrades he had known for decades. MSPD representatives feared an expansion of the uprisings as a result of the murders. Some briefly considered resigning. Noske, on the other hand, in a 1923 retrospect described the people who had been murdered as the main culprits in the revolution's degeneration into civil war. Thousands had asked beforehand "if no one would render the troublemakers harmless".

Leo Jogiches, Rosa Luxemburg's former partner, took over the leadership of the KPD after her death and tried to shed light on the murders. In an article in the party's Die Rote Fahne (The Red Flag) newspaper on 12 February 1919, he revealed the names of some of those his own research led him to suspect of being involved. He was arrested in March 1919 during additional Freikorps operations against left-wing workers' leaders and murdered in prison.

Criminal proceedings against alleged perpetrators were not instigated right away. On 16 February 1919 KPD members began demanding an independent investigation by a non-military special court because they feared suppression of evidence. It was not until May 1919 that some of the perpetrators – including Otto Runge and Kurt Vogel – were brought before a military field court of their own division. The main trial took place from 8 to 14 May 1919. There was repeated testimony that a "ministry aiding the MSPD" had offered a bounty of 100,000 marks for the capture of the Spartacus leaders. Wilhelm Pieck was one of the most important witnesses of the incidents at the hotel that led up to the murders. He and a number of employees of the hotel had been aware of the mistreatment that took place before the murders and overheard telephone calls between officers and their superiors. Pieck testified that he saw "an officer, addressed by the others as 'captain' walking around offering cigarettes to the soldiers and saying, 'The gang must not leave the Eden Hotel alive!' ... A short time after that, a maid came up, fell into the arms of a colleague, and exclaimed, 'I'll never be free of the image of that poor woman being knocked down and dragged around.'"

Runge received two years in prison, Vogel 28 months. The officers involved, the brothers Heinz and Horst von Pflugk-Harttung, were acquitted. Their commander Waldemar Pabst was not charged, and others who had possibly given orders were not sought out. As commander-in-chief of the armed forces, Gustav Noske personally confirmed the verdicts with his signature.

Vogel was taken out of Moabit Prison on 17 May, three days after the sentencing, by a Lieutenant Lindemann for transfer to Tegel Prison. Lindemann was in fact Captain Lieutenant (and later Admiral) Wilhelm Canaris, who took Vogel to the Netherlands by car. Canaris was never prosecuted for the action.

Representatives of the KPD and USPD, along with some from the MSPD and the liberals regarded the military trial and verdicts as a judicial scandal. Attempts to challenge the verdict and reopen the trial in a higher court were put off. All the remaining members of the Revolutionary Committee were imprisoned but later released for lack of evidence to show that they were planning an armed coup. It was not until 1929 that Paul Jorns, who had been the military judge in the trial, was dismissed for bias.

In 1934 the Nazi regime granted Otto Runge compensation for his imprisonment and Kurt Vogel convalescence using taxpayers' money. In January 1935 the National Socialists leveled Luxemburg's and Liebknecht's graves, presumably also disposing of their bones.

The journalist and right-wing politician Eduard Stadtler stated in his 1935 memoirs that the murders were contract killings. He wrote that on a visit to Pabst on 12 January he had "requested the murders from him" and that Pabst told him later who had carried them out. Pabst also indicated that he had been in contact with Noske.

In 1959 Pabst had a conversation with Günther Nollau, later vice president of the German Federal Office for the Protection of the Constitution, who recorded what Pabst said: "During that time he [Pabst] had heard Karl Liebknecht and Rosa Luxemburg speak in Berlin. Wearing civilian clothes, he mingled with the crowd. His observations led him to the conclusion that the two were extraordinarily dangerous and that there was no one on their side to counter them. He therefore decided to get rid of them." In 1962 Pabst stated in an interview with Der Spiegel that Noske had permitted the murders and afterwards covered up the lack of prosecutions. In 1970 a letter was found in Pabst's estate in which he wrote: "It is clear that I could not have carried out the action without Noske's approval – with Ebert in the background – and that I also had to protect my officers. But very few people have understood why I was never questioned or brought up on charges. As a man of honor, I responded to the behavior of the MSPD by keeping my mouth shut for 50 years about our cooperation."

Noske always denied the conversation overheard by Pabst in which he was said to have made an agreement to cooperate in the arrest and murder of the Spartacists. Otto Kranzbühler, who later became the lawyer for Hermann Souchon, the man who shot Rosa Luxemburg, stated that Pabst had confirmed to him the telephone conversation with Noske. Biographers also believe that Pabst probably consulted with Noske or Hans von Seeckt of the army command.

Consequences 

The uprising did not have a mass base and was, according to historian Heinrich August Winkler, only an "attempted coup by a radical minority". Its rapid suppression therefore was no surprise. It was probably also inevitable, since without it, the result would probably have been a civil war throughout Germany and military intervention by the victorious powers. After the uprising was quashed, Ebert could continue on the path towards establishing a parliament. On 19 January 1919 elections for the National Assembly were held. The Assembly finalized the Weimar Constitution on 11 August and created the first functioning German democracy, the Weimar Republic.

The bloody suppression of the uprising left the SPD under a heavy burden. In the elections to the National Assembly, it received 37.9 percent of the vote, while the USPD received 7.6 percent, with the result that the two already hostile left-wing parties did not obtain an absolute majority. In the subsequent elections during the life of the Weimar Republic, the SPD never again achieved more than 30 percent of the vote and thus remained dependent on coalitions with the middle-class parties of the center in order to participate in the government, even after its reunification with most of the USPD in 1920.

Remembrances 

Every year on the second weekend of January, the Liebknecht-Luxemburg demonstration takes place in Berlin to commemorate Karl Liebknecht and Rosa Luxemburg. It ends at the Socialists' Memorial in the Friedrichsfelde Central Cemetery.

At Rathausstraße 10 in Berlin-Lichtenberg, there is a memorial with the names of the militants killed there during the later Berlin March Battles.

Evaluation 
In the historiography of the former German Democratic Republic (East Germany), the uprising was judged very positively. Its view was that only the KPD had succeeded in forming a Marxist-Leninist fighting party and created a crucial prerequisite for the victory of the proletarian revolution; in this respect, the KPD's foundation was one of the decisive turning points in the history of the German workers' movement. This interpretation exaggerated the strength of the Spartacus League and its influence and glossed over its failed tactics. Since the 1990 German reunification, historical scholarship has evaluated the uprising predominantly negatively. Hans Mommsen labeled the insurgents' actions a "terrorist coup tactic". Hagen Schulze wrote that their goal was a "socialist, red revolution and a dictatorship of the working class". Heinrich August Winkler sees the January uprising as an "insurrection against democracy"; much like the Bolsheviks, who used force of arms to disperse the democratically elected Russian Constituent Assembly in January 1918, Liebknecht and his followers wanted to prevent formation of a parliamentary government even before the elections to the National Assembly. Historian Henning Köhler characterizes the uprising as "blind action", a "struggle for power … corresponding to the Bolshevik model". Hans-Ulrich Wehler was of the opinion that the KPD, against Luxemburg's advice, "gave in to a putschist current that sought to unleash a German civil war by means of the Berlin January uprising". Sönke Neitzel calls the uprising a "spontaneous, leaderless action". Irish historian Mark Jones makes a similar judgment, characterizing the uprising as an "improvised coup attempt with very little real chance of success".

References

Further reading (English language)

External links
 

1919 in Germany
1919 labor disputes and strikes
20th-century rebellions
Conflicts in 1919
General strikes in Europe
German Revolution of 1918–1919
Labor in Germany
Protests in Germany
Rebellions in Germany
Battles involving Germany